The Royal Brunei Navy (RBN) (abbreviated TLDB) is the naval defence force of Brunei Darussalam.  It is a small but relatively well-equipped military force whose main responsibility is to conduct search and rescue missions, and to deter and defend the Brunei waters against attack mounted by sea-borne forces.

Since 1977, the Royal Brunei Navy has been equipped with missile gun boats and other coastal patrol craft. All the ships names are prefixed KDB as in Kapal Diraja Brunei (Royal Brunei Ship in Malay). The Royal Brunei Navy has been commanded by First Admiral Pg Dato Seri Pahlawan Norazmi Pg Hj Muhammad since .

History
It was initially known as Boat Section of the Royal Brunei Armed Forces. Its manning strength was only 18 in number, including one officer from the First Battalion who had attended a basic military course in Malaya in 1961 until 1964. This Boat Section was equipped with a number of aluminium boats, known as Temuai in Malay and Fast Assault Boats (FABs). The role of the Boat Section was solely to provide transportation of infantry elements to the interior of Brunei. As the organisation expanded with the aid of stable economic growth, the Boat Section was renamed the Boat Company in 1966.

The Boat Company received three river patrol boats in 1966.  These boats were named KDB Bendahara, KDB Maharajalela, and KDB Kermaindera.  All the ships were crewed by Bruneians, led by a qualified commanding officer.  In the same year, the strength of the Boat Company was enhanced with hovercraft vessels type SR.N5, followed by SR.N6 in 1968.

The first fast patrol craft was accepted in 1968 and named KDB Pahlawan.  It became the first flagship for the Boat Company.

The Boat Company was reorganised as Angkatan Laut Pertama, Askar Melayu DiRaja Brunei (ALP AMDB or the First Sea Battalion, Royal Brunei Malay Regiment in Malay).  It was one of the larger branches of Royal Brunei Malay Regiment.  During that time, the estimated strength of Angkatan Laut Pertama, Askar Melayu DiRaja Brunei was 42 personnel, including an officer, while assets consisted of one fast patrol craft, three river patrol boats, two hovercraft vessels, fast assault boats, a few long boats, and Temuai (aluminium boats).

In 1971, the First Sea Battalion received two more coastal patrol craft, KDB Saleha and KDB Masna.

The First Sea Battalion was reorganised again on 1 October 1991 as the Royal Brunei Navy, due to the growth of the armed forces in Brunei after independence from the United Kingdom.

In 2019, the RBN unveiled the Digital Disruptive Pattern BDU in digital blue colours at the 58th anniversary celebration at the Bolkiah Garrison.

Roles and organisation
The roles of the Royal Brunei Navy are:
Deterrence against attack mounted by sea-borne forces
Protection of national offshore resources
Maintaining Sea Lines of Communication (SLOC)
Surveillance of the  EEZ
Maritime Search & Rescue operations
Support of units of the Royal Brunei Armed Forces operational activities
Provide support for other security agencies and ministries as ordered by Ministry of Defence of Brunei.

The Royal Brunei Navy is divided into four main components as follows:
Fleet
Administration
Training
Logistics

Ships of Royal Brunei Navy

The current fleet of the Royal Brunei Navy is as follows:

Others
Personnel launches used for riverine patrols
01 Aman
02 Damai
04 Sentosa
06 Sejahteru
Fisheries and Industry / Primary Resources ministries also operate  patrol boats built by Syarikat Cheoy Lee Shipyards (delivered 2002).

Future acquisition
Patrol vessel
Fearless-class
Royal Brunei Navy (RBN) also interested to procure some of the Fearless-class patrol vessel that have been retired from Republic of Singapore Navy (RSN).
Singapore decommissioned Gallant and Brave in December 2020 and August 2019, respectively. These vessels will be known as KDB As-Siddiq and KDB Al-Faruq , respectively, once commissioned by the RBN.

Historical equipment
Pahlawan-class patrol boat
KDB Pahlawan P-01 — Brunei's first patrol boat
KDB Bakti

F2000 (Nakhoda Ragam-class) corvettes

The Royal Brunei Navy aimed to undergo a large-scale modernisation, with the upgrading of the Muara Naval Base, and the purchase of three British-built corvettes from BAE Systems Naval Ships, Scotland.  The ships were armed with MBDA Exocet Block II anti-ship missiles and MBDA Seawolf surface-to-air missiles.  The contract was awarded to GEC-Marconi in 1995: the Nakhoda Ragam class OPVs were launched in January 2001, June 2001, and June 2002, at the then BAE Systems Marine yard at Scotstoun.  These were completed but not delivered from BAE Systems Naval Ships in Scotstoun due to claims by the Royal Brunei Navy that the ships fail to meet the required specifications.

The contract dispute was the subject of arbitration.  When the dispute was settled, the vessels were handed over to Royal Brunei Technical Services in June 2007.  In 2007, Brunei contracted the German Lürssen ship yard to find a new customer for the three ships, though by 2011 the vessels remained unsold and laid up at Barrow-in-Furness.

These ships were eventually purchased by the Indonesian Navy and renamed Bung Tomo-class corvettes.

Muara Naval Base
The administration of First Sea Battalion moved to a new base at Jalan Tanjong Pelumpong Muara in 1974.  This base is now known as the Muara Naval Base.  The Muara Naval Base serves as the headquarters of the Royal Brunei Navy.  It was expanded in 1997 to include facilities to support three offshore support vessels.

Muara Naval Base is frequently visited by foreign warships, most notable are the frequent visits by British Royal Navy ships.  Persekutuan Pengakap Negara Brunei Darussalam visits the Naval base sometimes too.

Joint exercises and training
The Royal Brunei Navy and the Republic of Singapore Navy co-operate with each other through an annual joint exercise, code-named Exercise Pelican.

Officers and soldiers of the Royal Brunei Navy are also sent overseas for advanced training, generally to Australia, Brazil, Malaysia, New Zealand, Singapore, United Kingdom, and United States of America.

Exercise SEAGULL 03-07 was held in Brunei from 2 to 10 September 2007, between the Royal Brunei Navy and their Philippine Navy counterparts.  Participating ships include the Philippine Navy corvette BRP Rizal (PS-74) and patrol gunboat BRP Federico Martir (PG-385), and Royal Brunei Navy ships KDB Pejuang P03, KDB Seteria P04, KDB Perwira P14 and KDB Penyerang P16.  They conducted series of drills, including mine clearance, under-water operations, replenishment at sea, night encounter exercise, boarding exercise, and other naval tactical exercises.

Museum
KDB Maharajalela (P-22) is on display at Muzium Angkatan Bersenjata Diraja Brunei or Royal Brunei Armed Forces Museum, Bandar Seri Begawan.

Military ranks

Commissioned officer ranks
The rank insignia of commissioned officers.

Other ranks
The rank insignia of non-commissioned officers and enlisted personnel.

Gallery

See also

Royal Brunei Armed Forces
Royal Brunei Air Force
Royal Brunei Land Forces

References

External links

 
Navy
Brunei